A gasser is a type of hot rod car originally used for drag racing. This style of custom car build originated in United States in the late 1950s and continued until the early 1970s. In the days before Pro Stock, the A/Gas cars were the fastest stock-appearing racers around.

History 
Gassers are based on closed body production models from the 1930s to mid-1960s, which have been stripped of extraneous weight and jacked up using a beam axle or tubular axle to provide better weight distribution on acceleration (beam axles are also lighter than an independent front suspension), though a raised stock front suspension is common as well. Common weight reduction techniques include fiberglass body panels, stripped interiors, and Lexan windows (sometimes color tinted).

The 1933-36 Willys coupés and pickups were very popular gassers. The best-known would be the 1933 Willys 77.  While neither cheap nor plentiful, it was a competitive and lightweight choice satisfying the rules of the era (which required a ladder frame).  At least one gasser incorporated a Willys frame in a Ford body to placate their sponsor while keeping it track-legal.   Keith Ferrell's Dogcatcher, for instance, was a 1936 delivery with a fuel injected small-block Chevrolet, built for the class; in 1967, Ferrell deliberately left something off to run it in B/Altered (later, with a supercharger, in BB/A).

After the company revived, the 1937-42 coupés, sedans, and pickups were again popular with hot rodders and gasser teams, and again, comparatively low production leaves unexplained why they gained so much attention.  Ollie Olsen's 1940 coupé Wil-A-Meaner (driven by Bob "Rapid" Dwyer) won the 1961 Nationals' A/G title.  Between 1962 and 1964, the Hassel & Vogelsong 1940 coupé "was the scourge of B/Gas", winning the 1963 and 1964 Nationals and setting a 1964 national record at 11.34. In 1967, the Hrudka Brothers' 1933 panel delivery was a popular wheelstander.

Postwar Willyses were also used (such as the Bremerton, Washington-based Speed Sport Specialties 1954 Willys in B/Gas), but, despite being a better chassis than the 1955-7 Chevrolet, were never as popular as the prewar cars.

Combinations could be unusual.  Fujimo, Too! was a B/G 1950 Plymouth business coupé (run by Adler and Trout) with an injected Oldsmobile and Hydro-Motive transmission.

NHRA first licensed women drivers in gas classes in 1963, when Roberta Leighton, member of the Dust Devils Car Club and driver of an injected El Camino, was first admitted.

Throughout the 1960s, the Stickle and Riffle Anglia, based out of the Rod Shop and driven by Bob Riffle, were frequent winners. Their only national title, however, was the B/G title at the 1967 Nationals and C/G at the 1968 Nationals.

At the 1965 NHRA Nationals, held at Indianapolis Raceway Park in Indianapolis, Indiana, 1941 Willyses driven by Dick Bourgeous (owned by "Big John" Mazmanian, sponsored by Engle Cams) and Doug "Cookie" Cook (the Stone-Woods-Cook gasser, sponsored by Isky Cams) faced off in A/GS.

Stone-Woods-Cook abandoned A/GS for Top Fuel Funny Car by the start of the 1967 season.

Late model cars were first allowed in the Gas classes in 1967.

Mazmanian would quit the gas classes for fuel funny car in 1968.

Gas classes were eliminated by NHRA in 1972.  However, the NHRA still categorises gasers in sportsman categories, and vehicles can run gasoline or alcohol fuel (the latter safer in case of fire).  The term "Super Gas" in NHRA refers to the rules that prohibit dragsters and mandate full-bodied race cars in that category today.

Engine
Because they were primarily built for racing, these cars typically had the engine swapped to a larger or more powerful one, or the existing stock engine modified (often heavily). It was very common to fit a Roots supercharger modified from original use on General Motors two-cycle diesel truck engines and mechanical fuel injection, manufactured by Algon, Hilborn, or Crower.

Suspension

With form being dictated by function, their appearance is often very top heavy and ungainly, largely due to front ends being raised higher than stock, to assist in the weight transfer during rapid acceleration (racing). Having their exhaust pipes exit through the front fender well is a common characteristic of gassers, as is having bodies painted in flamboyant metalflakes, pearls, and candy finishes complemented by lettering in wild fonts. Most gassers also had ladder bars.

Name
The name arose because they competed in a gasoline-fueled drag racing class, rather than one using methanol or nitromethane.

Named cars 
There were a number of cars run under names.

NHRA National Champions 
Source

1955, Great Bend, Kansas

1956, Kansas City, Missouri

1957, Oklahoma City, Oklahoma

1958, Oklahoma City, Oklahoma

1959, Detroit Dragway

1960, Detroit Dragway

1961, Indianapolis Raceway Park

1962, NHRA Nationals, Indianapolis Raceway Park

1963, NHRA Nationals, Indianapolis Raceway Park

1964, NHRA Nationals, Indianapolis Raceway Park

1965, NHRA Nationals, Indianapolis Raceway Park

1966, NHRA Nationals, Indianapolis Raceway Park

1967, NHRA Nationals, Indianapolis Raceway Park

References

Further reading

Drag racing cars
Kustom Kulture